Marcus Daniell and Artem Sitak were the defending champions, but lost in the first round to Andrea Arnaboldi and Marc López.

Mate Pavić and Michael Venus won the title, defeating Alexander and Mischa Zverev in the final, 7–5, 7–6(7–4).

Seeds

Draw

Draw

References 
 Main Draw

O
Doubles